"Share the Land" is a song written by Burton Cummings and performed by The Guess Who.  It reached #2 in Canada, #10 on the Billboard Hot 100, and #63 in Australia in 1970.  The song was also released in the United Kingdom as a single, but it did not chart.  The song is featured on their 1970 album, Share the Land.

The song was produced by Jack Richardson and arranged by The Guess Who. The song's lyrics looks forward to a future point where the world's land is to be given away and everyone will live together.

Personnel
Burton Cummings – lead vocals, keyboards
Kurt Winter – lead guitar, backing vocals
Greg Leskiw – rhythm guitar, backing vocals
Jim Kale – bass 
Garry Peterson – drums

Chart positions

Weekly charts

Year-end charts

References

1970 songs
1970 singles
Songs written by Burton Cummings
The Guess Who songs
Song recordings produced by Jack Richardson (record producer)
RCA Victor singles
RCA Records singles